Liamegalonychus is a genus of ground beetles in the family Carabidae. There are about eight described species in Liamegalonychus, found in Africa.

Species
These eight species belong to the genus Liamegalonychus:
 Liamegalonychus alluaudi (Burgeon, 1935)  (Kenya and Uganda)
 Liamegalonychus bambusicola (Basilewsky, 1954)  (Kenya and Uganda)
 Liamegalonychus buxtoni (Burgeon, 1935)  (Democratic Republic of the Congo and Uganda)
 Liamegalonychus cratericola (Burgeon, 1935)  (Kenya and Uganda)
 Liamegalonychus diversus (Péringuey, 1896)  (South Africa)
 Liamegalonychus ericarum (Burgeon, 1935)  (Kenya and Uganda)
 Liamegalonychus niger (Basilewsky, 1950)  (South Africa)
 Liamegalonychus oblongus (Boheman, 1848)  (South Africa and Zimbabwe)

References

Platyninae